Kodino is a rural locality (a village) in Myaksinskoye Rural Settlement, Cherepovetsky District, Vologda Oblast, Russia. The population was 26 as of 2002.

Geography 
Frolovo is the nearest rural locality.

References 

Rural localities in Cherepovetsky District